Racer-X is the third EP by American post-hardcore band Big Black. It was released by Homestead Records in 1985 and reissued by Touch and Go Records in 1992.

Racer-X was the first of Big Black's records to cement their instrumental lineup of two guitars, one bass guitar and a Roland TR-606 drum machine. It was the final album to feature the bass playing of Jeff Pezzati who left to dedicate more time on his primary band Naked Raygun.

Like Big Black's first 2 EPs, the original record contained just six songs (five by Big Black, one by James Brown) clocking in at under 20 minutes total.

Title
Racer X was a character on the seminal anime series Speed Racer. The EP's title track makes numerous references to the original TV show.

Single
The song "Il Duce" (about Benito Mussolini) was recorded in the same session as the songs from the Racer-X EP. The song was released the same year as a 7" single backed with "Big Money" from the Atomizer LP.  Homestead records also issued a promotional 12" version of the single with "Il Duce" and "Big Money" on the A-side, plus three live tracks on the B-side.

Cover art
The original EP featured cover art by Nate Kaatrud (better known as National Kato/Nash Kato) from the band Urge Overkill. When Touch and Go reissued the EP in 1992, the original artwork could not be found and a new cover was produced.

Influence
The Japandroids covered "Racer-X" during their Dec 15, 2009 Daytrotter session. Of “Racer X” they say this:
We’re recording a 7-inch in January and this going to be the B-side. This song was originally done by Big Black and came out on the Racer-X EP in 1984. Our version is pretty good, but the original is a masterpiece.

Track listing
"Racer-X" - 4:01
"Shotgun" - 3:28
"The Ugly American" - 2:41
"Deep Six" - 3:14
"Sleep!" - 2:42
"The Big Payback" (James Brown) - 2:29

Personnel
 Steve Albini: guitar, vocals
 Santiago Durango: guitar
 Jeff Pezzati: bass
 Roland: Roland
 John Bonhen: saxophone on "The Ugly American"

Recorded by Iain Burgess in Chicago.

References

Big Black EPs
1985 EPs
Homestead Records EPs
Touch and Go Records EPs